This is the discography of the British rock band Status Quo. They have released around 100 singles and have spent over 400 weeks in the UK Singles Chart. They have spent over 500 weeks in the UK Albums Chart and are one of the most successful bands of all time in the UK. Their most recent album, Backbone, was released in 2019.

For a full list of the band's songs, see List of songs by Status Quo.

Albums

Studio albums

Live albums

Compilation albums

Box sets

Singles

1960s–1970s

1980s–1990s

2000s–present

Videos

Video albums

Music videos

Notes

References

External links
 
 

Discography
Rock music group discographies
Discographies of British artists